General Haynes may refer to:

Caleb V. Haynes (1895–1966), U.S. Air Force major general
Fred E. Haynes Jr. (1921–2010), U.S. Marine Corps major general
Hezekiah Haynes (died 1693), English Civil War major general
Ira Allen Haynes (1859–1955), U.S. Army brigadier general
Loyal M. Haynes (fl. 1940s–1950s), U.S. Army brigadier general
Thomas J. Haynes (fl. 1970s–2000s), Rhode Island Air National Guard major general